Susan Cushman (born January 7, 1972 in Cold Lake, Alberta) is a retired female gymnast from Canada, who competed for her native country in the rhythmic gymnastics competition at the 1992 Summer Olympics. She won a total number of three medals at the 1991 Pan American Games in Havana, Cuba.

References
sports-reference

1972 births
Living people
Canadian rhythmic gymnasts
Gymnasts at the 1992 Summer Olympics
Olympic gymnasts of Canada
Sportspeople from Alberta
People from Cold Lake, Alberta
Gymnasts at the 1991 Pan American Games
Pan American Games gold medalists for Canada
Pan American Games bronze medalists for Canada
Pan American Games medalists in gymnastics
Universiade medalists in gymnastics
Universiade bronze medalists for Canada
Medalists at the 1991 Pan American Games
20th-century Canadian women